Kyirong or Gyirong,
Jilong in Chinese and Kerung in Nepalese, is a town situated in the southern part of Gyirong County in the Tibet Autonomous Region, China. It has a subtropical mountain monsoon climate, with reasonable precipitation and warm weather, unusual for Tibet.

Geography 

In Kyirong Town, there is a village of ethnic Nepali referred to as Daman people. They are descendants of the Nepalese Gurkha army from centuries ago. Previously stateless, they were granted Chinese citizenship in 2003.

History

After the division of the Tibetan Empire, descendants of Songtsen Gampo fled to Kyirong and then founded the Gongtang Kingdom, whose ruins are now in Kyirong. 

During the first campaign of the Sino-Nepalese War in the late-1780s, the Nepalese forces captured Kyirong. It was recaptured by joint Chinese and Tibetan forces during the second campaign in July 1792.

Historically, Kyirong Town has been an important town in the cross border trade between China and Nepal as it was located on a major traditional trade thoroughfare between the two countries. In 1961, Kyirong was established as a port of entry from Rasuwa Fort in Nepal by the Chinese government. In December 2014, the Gyirong port of entry was opened to international users and this route between China and Nepal was considered to be more reliable than the one through the Zhangmu-Kodari border crossing.

The April 2015 earthquake
Kyirong/Rasuwa played a minor role as a cross-border trade route until about a year after the April 2015 Nepal earthquake as the cross-border route through the Zhangmu-Kodari border crossing was more badly damaged, only reopening on 29 May 2019. Both corridors sustained quake damage and had been closed due to the collapse of the border bridges at both locations and due to continuing rockfall from unstable hillsides, the Kyirong/Rasuwa crossing being technically easier to re-open.

The Kyirong-Rasuwa Fort route experienced quicker recovery since it is favoured for trans-Himalayan connectivity due to lower elevation and a gentler pass slope. A temporary bridge was constructed in place of the damaged concrete bridge while a new concrete bridge was constructed and opened on 7 June 2019. However, hillside stabilization had yet to be addressed as of Nov 2018 and this was necessary before major infrastructure work could progress. Bridges remained damaged and only recently begun reconstruction. Additionally, transnational electricity projects are expected to pass through the area, although funding is still a question mark and the Nepali government remains cash-strapped and overburdened with competing projects.

References

Bibliography
 
 
 

Gyirong County
China–Nepal border crossings